Cheluo is a town in Gaoyou, Yangzhou, Jiangsu.  , it has 2 residential communities and 11 villages under its administration.

References

Gaoyou
Township-level divisions of Jiangsu